Dove c'è musica (Where There Is Music) is the seventh studio album by Italian pop/rock singer Eros Ramazzotti, released in 1996 on the BMG label.  It is Ramazzotti's first self-produced album and the first without any involvement from long-time collaborator Piero Cassano.  Dove c'è musica was Ramazzotti's most successful album to that point, topping the Albums chart in six countries including Italy and Germany.

Track listing

Dove c'è musica

Donde hay música

Personnel 

Alex Baroni – backing vocals, chorus
Luca Bignardi – programming, engineer, drum programming, mixing
Alberto Bonardi – engineer, mixing assistant
Marco Borsatti – mixing assistant
Alex Brown – backing vocals, chorus
Lenny Castro – percussion
Vinnie Colaiuta – drums
Emanuela Cortesi – backing vocals, chorus
Lynn Davis – backing vocals, chorus
Michelangelo Di Battista – photography
Nathan East – bass
David Garfield – piano
Humberto Gatica – mixing
Paolo Gianolio – acoustic guitar, bass
Jim Gilstrap – backing vocals, chorus
Gary Grant – trumpet
Jerry Hey – trumpet
Kim Hutchcroft – tenor sax
Phillip Ingram – backing vocals, chorus
Luca Jurman – backing vocals 	
Michael Landau – guitar, electric guitar
Charles Loper – trombone
Nacho Maño – adaptation
Sid Page – violin
John Pena – bass
Antonella Pepe – backing vocals, chorus
John Pierce – bass
Eros Ramazzotti – vocals, producer
Bill Reichenbach Jr. – trombone
Steve Tavaglione – tenor sax
Celso Valli – organ, piano, arranger, director, keyboards, organ, programming, backing vocals, chorus, producer, drum programming
Mimmo Verduci – art direction, concept
Tommy Vicari – engineer
Traisey Elana Williams – backing vocals

Charts

Weekly charts

Year-end charts

Sales and certifications

See also
 List of best-selling albums in Germany
 List of best-selling albums in Italy

References

Eros Ramazzotti albums
1996 albums
Sony Music Italy albums